Patricia Eachus née Keller (born 26 September 1989) is a Swiss Paralympic athlete who competes in middle-distance and long-distance racing events in international level events.

In 2020, she finished in 4th place in the women's wheelchair race at the 2020 London Marathon in London, United Kingdom.

References

1989 births
Living people
People from Sursee District
Paralympic athletes of Switzerland
Swiss female wheelchair racers
Athletes (track and field) at the 2012 Summer Paralympics
Sportspeople from the canton of Lucerne
21st-century Swiss women